Fidelity European Trust is a large British investment trust dedicated to long-term investments across Continental Europe. Established in 1991, the company is a constituent of the FTSE 250 Index. The chairman is Vivian Bazalgette. The Trust is managed by Fidelity International. The company changed its name from Fidelity European Values to Fidelity European Trust on 1 October 2020.

References

External links
  Official site
  Fidelity European Values
 Fund Composition

Investment trusts of the United Kingdom
Companies listed on the London Stock Exchange